Metallbau Karl Zeilinger is one of the oldest metalworking companies in Austria, the family business founded in 1516 and located in Himmelberg, Carinthia.

Since 1874 the company is managed by the Zeilinger and Offner families and today it focuses on the metalware production and metal constructions.

See also 
List of oldest companies

References

External links 
Homepage

Metal companies of Austria
Manufacturing companies established in the 16th century
16th-century establishments in the Holy Roman Empire
Economy of Carinthia (state)
Establishments in the Duchy of Carinthia